[[Image:Xiao blowhole.JPG|thumb|The mouthpiece of the Xiao flute.]]
Nanguan (also nanyin, nanyue, xianguan, or nanqu) is a style of Chinese classical music from the southern Chinese province of Fujian. It is also popular in Taiwan, particularly Lukang on west coast, as well as among Overseas Chinese in Southeast Asia.

Fujian is a mountainous coastal province of China. Its provincial capital is Fuzhou, while Quanzhou was a major port in the 7th century CE, the period between the Sui and Tang eras. Situated upon an important maritime trade route, it was a conduit for elements of distant cultures. The result was what is now known as nanguan music, which today preserves many archaic features.

It is a genre strongly associated with male-only community amateur musical associations (quguan or "song-clubs"), each formerly generally linked to a particular temple, and is viewed as a polite accomplishment and a worthy social service, distinct from the world of professional entertainers. It is typically slow, gentle, delicate and melodic, heterophonic and employing four basic scales.

Nanguan was inscribed in 2009 on the Representative List of the Intangible Cultural Heritage of Humanity by UNESCO.

Styles and instruments
Nanguan repertory falls into three overlapping styles, called chí, phó· and khiok (zhi, pu and qu in Mandarin), differentiated by the contexts in which they occur, by their function, the value accorded them by musicians and by their formal and timbral natures.

The Chí is perceived as the most "serious" repertoire: it is a purely instrumental suite normally more than thirty minutes in length, of two to five sections usually, each section being known as a cu or dei ("piece"). Each is associated with a lyric that alludes to a story but, although this may denote origins in song or opera, today chí is an important and respected instrumental repertory. However, the song text significantly eases the memorising of the piece.
Phó· (譜, pu in pinyin) literally means "notation", more formally as qingzou pu ("refined notation"), are typically performed by a 5-instrument ensemble.  These are pieces that have no associated texts and are thus written down in gongchepu notation. It is an instrumental style that uses a wider range than chí and that emphasises technical display.
Khiok is a vocal repertory: two thousand pieces exist in manuscript. It is lighter and less conservative in repertory and performance than chí. Most popular pieces today are in a fast common metre and last around five minutes.

A nanguan ensemble usually consists of five instruments. The pie (muban or wooden clapper) is usually played by the singer. The other four, known as the téng-sì-kóan or four higher instruments, are the four-stringed lute (gî-pê, or pipa 琵琶in Mandarin), a three-stringed, fretless, snakeskin-headed long-necked lute that is the ancestor of the Japanese shamisen, called the sam-hiân, (sanxian三弦 in Mandarin), the vertical flute, (siau, also called tōng-siau), and a two-stringed "hard-bowed" instrument called the jī-hiân, slightly differing from the Cantonese erxian二弦. Each of the four differs somewhat from the most usual modern form and so may be called the "nanguan pipa" etc. Each instrument has a fixed role. The gî-pê provides a steady rhythmic skeleton, supported by the sam-hiân. The siau, meanwhile, supplemented by the jī-hiân, puts "meat on the bones" with colourful counterpoints.

These instruments are essential to the genre, while the ē-sì-kóan（下四管） or four lower instruments are not used in every piece. These are percussion instruments, the chime (hiangzua), a combined chime and wood block called the giaolo, a pair of small bells (xiangjin) and a four-bar xylophone, the xidei. The transverse flute called the pin xiao (dizi in Mandarin) and the oboe-like aiya（噯仔） or xiao  are sometimes added in outdoor or ceremonial performances. When all six combine with the basic four, the whole ensemble is called a cha̍p-im  or "ten sounds".

Diaspora
Starting in the 17th century, the Hoklo people who immigrated from Fujian to Taiwan took with them informal folk music as well as more ritualized instrumental and operatic forms taught in amateur clubs, such as beiguan and nanguan. Large Hoklo diaspora can also be found in Malaysia, Guangdong, Hong Kong, Philippines, Singapore, Burma, Thailand and Indonesia, where they are usually referred to as Hokkien.

There are two nanguan associations in Singapore and there were formerly several in the Philippines; Tiong-Ho Long-Kun-sia is still active. Gang-a-tsui and Han-Tang Yuefu have popularized the nanguan'' ensemble abroad.  A Quanzhou nanguan music ensemble was founded in the early 1960s, and there is a Fuzhou folk music ensemble, founded in 1990.

References

External links
 Nanguan Music
 https://web.archive.org/web/20060223141339/http://www.nanyin.cn/ (Chinese)

Video
 (video from UNESCO's Intangible Cultural Heritage of Humanity )

Fujian
Hokkien music
Chinese styles of music
Intangible Cultural Heritage of Humanity
Taiwanese music
Singaporean music
Philippine music
Malaysian music